WJFV (1650 AM) is a commercial AM station licensed to Portsmouth, Virginia, and serving Hampton Roads. It broadcasts a conservative talk radio format and is owned by the Chesapeake-Portsmouth Broadcasting Corporation. The studios are on Brightwood Avenue in Richmond. 

By day, WJFV is powered at 10,000 watts non-directional. But to protect other stations on 1650 AM from interference, at night it reduces power to 1,000 watts. The transmitter is off Barnes Road in Chesapeake, Virginia, near Interstate 464.

Programming
Weekdays begin with station operator John Fredericks hosting a news and interview morning drive time show. The rest of the weekday schedule is made up of syndicated shows from Mark Levin, Steven K. Bannon, Dave Ramsey, Rita Cosby, Rob Carson and Red Eye Radio.  

Weekends include The Car Doctor, Rob Anannian, Free Talk Live and Todd Starnes, as well as repeats of weekday shows. Most hours begin with an update from Townhall Radio News.

History

Expanded band
This station originated as the expanded band "twin" of an existing station on the standard AM band. On March 17, 1997, the Federal Communications Commission (FCC) announced that 88 stations had been given permission to move to newly available "Expanded Band" transmitting frequencies, ranging from 1610 to 1700 kHz. WPMH, in Portsmouth, was authorized to move from 1010 to 1650 kHz.

A construction permit for the expanded band station was assigned the call sign WAWT on January 9, 1998. The call sign was changed to WHKT the next month. The FCC's initial policy was that both the original station and its expanded band counterpart could operate simultaneously for up to five years, after which owners would have to turn in one of the two licenses, depending on whether they preferred the new assignment or elected to remain on the original frequency. However, this deadline has been extended multiple times, and both stations have remained authorized. One restriction is that the FCC has generally required paired original and expanded band stations to remain under common ownership.

WHKT signed on the air in 1999, broadcasting an adult standards format under the branding "Timeless Classics."

Radio Disney
On December 12, 2001, the station switched to the Radio Disney network with a Children's Radio format. Radio Disney aired on WBVA until November 2001, when the station dropped the format over contractual issues relating to the ABC Radio Networks trying to buy the station. WHKT was acquired by The Walt Disney Company, adding it to the Radio Disney network.

On January 25, 2010, The Walt Disney Company announced that it was selling the station to Hampton Roads-area religious station owner Chesapeake-Portsmouth Broadcasting for $350,000. In the interim, Disney took WHKT, and five other Radio Disney stations slated to be sold, off the air. The station went silent on January 22. The sale was listed as "consummated" by the FCC as of May 5, 2010.

Urban gospel
On February 14, 2018, the station dropped its conservative talk "The Answer" format. It flipped to a mix of urban gospel and Christian talk and teaching. It used the moniker "Praise 104.9," also heard on WTJZ (1270 AM) and translators W245CK and W285FM.

WHKT and WTJZ exchanged call signs on November 5, 2021, with the call sign WTJZ moving from AM 1270 to AM 1650, and WHKT transferred from AM 1650 to AM 1270. The WTJZ call sign referred to "Tidewater Jazz", which had been adopted at AM 1270 in 1979.

Conservative talk
In August 2022, WTJZ returned to a conservative talk format. The previous "Praise 104.9" urban gospel format was moved to then-WKQA (AM 1110).

On October 11, 2022, AM 1650's WTJZ call sign was changed to WJFV, standing for the name of the operator and morning host, John Fredericks, and the state of Virginia. This in turn allowed the station on AM 1110 to change its call sign from WKQA to WTJZ, on November 2, 2022.

References

External links

2001 establishments in Virginia
Radio stations established in 2001
JFV
Former subsidiaries of The Walt Disney Company
Talk radio stations in the United States
Conservative talk radio